Hornøya is a small, uninhabited island in Vardø Municipality in Troms og Finnmark county, Norway. It lies in the Barents Sea, just east of the larger island of Vardøya where the town of Vardø is located. The island is the easternmost point of Norway proper.

Important Bird Area
The island is included in the Varangerfjord Important Bird Area (IBA), designated as such by BirdLife International for its support of large numbers of waterbirds, seabirds and waders, either breeding or overwintering.

See also
 Extreme points of Norway

References

Islands of the Barents Sea
Vardø
Uninhabited islands of Norway
Important Bird Areas of Norway
Important Bird Areas of Arctic islands
Islands of Troms og Finnmark